1971 in sports describes the year's events in world sport.

Alpine skiing
 Alpine Skiing World Cup
 Men's overall season champion: Gustav Thöni, Italy
 Women's overall season champion: Annemarie Pröll, Austria

American football
 17 January − Super Bowl V: the Baltimore Colts (AFC) won 16–13 over the Dallas Cowboys (NFC)
 Location: Miami Orange Bowl
 Attendance: 79,204
 MVP: Chuck Howley, LB (Dallas)
 25 December – The Miami Dolphins defeat the Kansas City Chiefs in a divisional playoff game.  The double-overtime contest is the longest game in NFL history, and the Chiefs' last home game at Municipal Stadium.
 Orange Bowl (1970 season):
 The Nebraska Cornhuskers won 17–12 over the Louisiana State Tigers to win the AP Poll national championship after the previous #1 Texas Longhorns lost in the Cotton Bowl and the #2 Ohio State Buckeyes lost in the Rose Bowl.
 24 October – death of Chuck Hughes, Detroit Lions wide receiver

Association football
 2 January – At the end of a Rangers–Celtic match at Ibrox Park in Glasgow, barriers at Stairway 13 give way under a mass of fans, killing 66 and injuring over 200 others.
 30 June – death of Georgi Asparuhov (28), Bulgarian international
 Atlético Mineiro wins the first Campeonato Brasileiro Série A
 Arsenal are the English First Division champions
 England – FA Cup – Arsenal won 2–1 over Liverpool to win The Double
 European Championship Cup Final: Ajax – Panathinaikos 2–0

Athletics
 August – Athletics at the 1971 Pan American Games held in Cali, Colombia
 August – 1971 European Athletics Championships held at Helsinki

Australian rules football
 Victorian Football League
 Hawthorn wins the 75th VFL Premiership (Hawthorn 12.10 (82) d St Kilda 11.9 (75))
 Brownlow Medal awarded to Ian Stewart (Richmond)
 SANFL
North Adelaide 10.19 (79) defeated Port Adelaide 9.5 (59)

Bandy

Baseball
 World Series – Pittsburgh Pirates won 4 games to 3 over the Baltimore Orioles. Game four, played on 13 October at Three Rivers Stadium in Pittsburgh, was the first night game in World Series history.

Basketball
 NCAA Division I Men's Basketball Championship –
 UCLA wins 68–62 over Villanova
 Indiana University Hires Bob Knight as their head basketball coach.
 NBA Finals –
 Milwaukee Bucks win 4 games to 0 over the Baltimore Bullets
 1971 ABA Finals –
 Utah Stars defeat Kentucky Colonels 4 games to 3; Stars defeat Indiana Pacers in division finals while Colonels defeat Virginia Squires.

Boxing
 8 March – Joe Frazier defeats Muhammad Ali at Madison Square Garden, in the first of three epic bouts between the two, to retain the World Heavyweight Championship.

Canadian football
 Grey Cup – Calgary Stampeders won 14–11 over the Toronto Argonauts
 Vanier Cup – Western Ontario Mustangs won 15–14 over the Alberta Golden Bears

Cricket
 5 January, Melbourne – first-ever One Day International is played after a Test match is abandoned because of rain, Australia beating England by 5 wickets.

Cycling
 Giro d'Italia won by Gösta Pettersson of Sweden
 Tour de France – Eddy Merckx of Belgium
 UCI Road World Championships – Men's road race – Eddy Merckx of Belgium

Field hockey
 Men's World Cup in Barcelona, Spain
 Gold Medal: Pakistan
 Silver Medal: Spain
 Bronze Medal: India
 Pan American Games (Men's Competition) in Cali, Colombia
 Gold Medal: Argentina
 Silver Medal: Mexico
 Bronze Medal: Canada

Figure skating
 World Figure Skating Championships –
 Men's champion: Ondrej Nepela, Czechoslovakia
 Ladies' champion: Trixi Schuba, Austria
 Pair skating champions: Irina Rodnina & Alexei Ulyanov, Soviet Union
 Ice dancing champions: Lyudmila Pakhomova & Alexandr Gorshkov, Soviet Union

Golf
Men's professional
 PGA Championship – Jack Nicklaus
 Masters Tournament – Charles Coody
 U.S. Open – Lee Trevino
 British Open – Lee Trevino
 PGA Tour money leader – Jack Nicklaus – $244,491
 Ryder Cup – United States won 18½ to 13½ over Britain in team golf
Men's amateur
 British Amateur – Steve Melnyk
 U.S. Amateur – Gary Cowan
Women's professional
 LPGA Championship – Kathy Whitworth
 U.S. Women's Open – JoAnne Carner – this win made her the first person ever to win three different USGA individual championship events.
 Titleholders Championship – not played
 LPGA Tour money leader – Kathy Whitworth – $41,181

Harness racing
 United States Pacing Triple Crown races –
 Cane Pace – Albatross
 Little Brown Jug – Nansemond
 Messenger Stakes – Albatross
 United States Trotting Triple Crown races –
 Hambletonian – Speedy Crown
 Yonkers Trot – Quick Pride
 Kentucky Futurity – Savoir
 Australian Inter Dominion Harness Racing Championship –
 Pacers: Stella Frost
 Trotters: Geffini

Horse racing
Steeplechases
 Cheltenham Gold Cup – L'Escargot
 Grand National – Specify
Flat races
 Australia – Melbourne Cup won by Silver Knight
 Canada – Queen's Plate won by Kennedy Road
 France – Prix de l'Arc de Triomphe won by Mill Reef
 Ireland – Irish Derby Stakes won by Irish Ball
 English Triple Crown Races:
 2,000 Guineas Stakes – Brigadier Gerard
 The Derby – Mill Reef
 St. Leger Stakes – Athens Wood
 United States Triple Crown Races:
 Kentucky Derby – Canonero II
 Preakness Stakes – Canonero II
 Belmont Stakes – Pass Catcher

Ice hockey
 13 April – death of Michel Brière (21), Canadian player with Pittsburgh Penguins
 Art Ross Trophy as the NHL's leading scorer during the regular season: Phil Esposito, Boston Bruins
 Hart Memorial Trophy for the NHL's Most Valuable Player: Bobby Orr, Boston Bruins
 Stanley Cup – Montreal Canadiens win 4 games to 3 over the Chicago Black Hawks
 World Hockey Championship
 Men's champion: Soviet Union defeated Czechoslovakia
 NCAA Men's Ice Hockey Championship – Boston University Terriers defeat University of Minnesota-Twin Cities Golden Gophers 4–2 in Syracuse, New York
 World Hockey Association (WHA) is formed as an alternative North American professional hockey league to the NHL

Lacrosse
 Cornell beats Maryland 12–6 to win the first NCAA Division I Men's Lacrosse Championship.
 The Brantford Warriors win the Mann Cup.
 The Richmond Roadrunners win the Minto Cup.
 The Victoria  win the Castrol Cup.

Motorsport

Radiosport
 Sixth Amateur Radio Direction Finding European Championship held in Duisburg, Federal Republic of Germany.

Rugby league
 18 September – the 1971 NSWRFL season culminates in a Grand Final victory for South Sydney, defeating St George 16–10
1971 New Zealand rugby league season
1970–71 Northern Rugby Football League season / 1971–72 Northern Rugby Football League season

Rugby union
 77th Five Nations Championship series is won by Wales who complete the Grand Slam

Snooker
 World Snooker Championship – John Spencer beats Warren Simpson 37–29

Swimming
 27 August – US swimmer Mark Spitz recaptures the world record in the men's 200m butterfly (long course), clocking 2:03.9 at a meet in Houston, Texas.
 31 August – Four days after Mark Spitz broke the world record in the men's 200m butterfly (long course), West Germany's Hans-Joachim Fassnacht betters the time to 2:03.3 at a meet in Landskrona, Sweden.

Tennis
 Grand Slam in tennis men's results:
 Australian Open – Ken Rosewall
 French Open – Jan Kodeš
 Wimbledon championships – John Newcombe
 U.S. Open – Stan Smith
 Grand Slam in tennis women's results:
 Australian Open – Margaret Court
 French Open – Evonne Goolagong
 Wimbledon championships – Evonne Goolagong
 U.S. Open – Billie Jean King
 Davis Cup – United States wins 3–2 over Romania in world tennis.
 Sixteen-year-old Chris Evert makes her US Open debut reaching the semifinals where she is defeated by eventual champion Billie Jean King.
 First time in 16 years that Americans won both the men's and women's title at the US Open.

Volleyball
 Men and Women's European Volleyball Championship held in Italy
 1971 Men's European Volleyball Championship won by the USSR
 1971 Women's European Volleyball Championship won by the USSR
 Volleyball at the 1971 Pan American Games held in Cali, Colombia
 Men's and women's tournaments both won by Cuba

Multi-sport events
 Sixth Pan American Games held in Cali, Colombia
 Sixth Mediterranean Games held in İzmir, Turkey

Awards
 ABC's Wide World of Sports Athlete of the Year: Lee Trevino, PGA Golf
 Associated Press Male Athlete of the Year – Lee Trevino, PGA golf
 Associated Press Female Athlete of the Year – Evonne Goolagong, Tennis
 Sports Illustrated Sportsman of the Year - Lee Trevino, PGA golf

References

 
Sports by year